Holliday Independent School District is a public school district based in Holliday, Texas (USA).

Located in Archer County, a small portion of the district extends into Wichita County. Besides Holliday, the only other sizeable town in the district is Lakeside City.

In 2009, the school district was rated "recognized" by the Texas Education Agency.

Schools
In the 2012–2013 school year, the district had students in three schools. 
Holliday High School (Grades 9-12)
Holliday Middle School (Grades 6-8)
Holliday Elementary School (Grades EE-5).

References

External links

Texas Education Agency

School districts in Archer County, Texas
School districts in Wichita County, Texas